Al-Saher Ahmed Radhi Stadium is a multi-use stadium in Baghdad, Iraq. It is used mostly for football matches and serves as the home stadium of Al-Karkh. The stadium holds 5,150 people.

The stadium was originally called Al-Mansour Local Administration Stadium and was renamed Al-Rasheed Stadium when Al-Rasheed SC took over the ground in 1984. It became known as  Al-Karkh Stadium after Al-Karkh replaced the dissolved Al-Rasheed in the top division in 1990.

In June 2020, following the death of former Al-Rasheed player Ahmed Radhi, the stadium was renamed Al-Saher Ahmed Radhi Stadium.

Gallery

See also 
List of football stadiums in Iraq

References

External links
Venue information

Football venues in Iraq
Buildings and structures in Baghdad
Sport in Baghdad